European Romantic Review (ERR) is a scholarly peer-review journal founded in 1990 and devoted to the interdisciplinary study of nineteenth-century culture.  

The journal was co-founded by the poet and literary critic Kelly Grovier. Published six times a year by Taylor & Francis, ERR is closely linked with NASSR (The North American Society for the Study of Romanticism).

External links
 European Romantic Review homepage
 Online archive of journal

Cultural journals